The Nanjing Baguazhou Yangtze River Bridge, formerly Second Nanjing Yangtze Bridge, is a cable-stayed bridge over the Yangtze River in Nanjing, China. The bridge spans  carrying traffic on the G36 Nanjing–Luoyang Expressway and new route of China National Highway 104. When it was completed it was the third longest cable-stayed span in the world.  it is still among the 20 longest spans. The bridge crosses from the Qixia District in south-east of the river over to Bagua Island. The bridge has renamed on 20 December 2019.

See also 
 List of largest cable-stayed bridges
 List of tallest bridges in the world
 Yangtze River bridges and tunnels

References 

Bridges over the Yangtze River
Cable-stayed bridges in China
Bridges completed in 2001
Bridges in Jiangsu